Harry Boland (21 September 1925 – 18 December 2013) was an Irish basketball player who competed in the 1948 Summer Olympics in London, England.

Biography 
Boland born in Dublin, Ireland. He was named after his uncle Harry Boland, activist and politician active during the Irish revolutionary period. His father Gerald and brother Kevin were both senior members of Fianna Fáil and Irish government ministers.

Boland was a close friend of Charles Haughey. They knew each other from childhood, having both attended St. Joseph's Secondary C.B.S. in Fairview, and they set up accountancy firm Haughey, Boland & Co after graduating from UCD. Haughey later left to pursue his political career.

Death 
Harry Boland died on 18 December 2013, aged 88, in Dublin. He was survived by his wife, Noirin, and was buried at St. Fintan's Cemetery in Sutton, Dublin.

References

1925 births
2013 deaths
Harry
Sportspeople from Dublin (city)
Irish men's basketball players
Irish accountants
Olympic basketball players of Ireland
Basketball players at the 1948 Summer Olympics
People educated at St. Joseph's CBS, Fairview